Celestino Turletti (1845–1904) was an Italian painter and engraver.

He initially studied accounting, then attended the Accademia Albertina of Turin, studying under the painters Enrico Gamba and Andrea Gastaldi and engraving from A Lauro. He then moved to Florence to work with Adolfo Bignami.

His paintings often depicted Genre subjects often in humorous situations. In 1880 he exhibited in Turin: Monsignore assisterà alla rappresentazione; I martiri della grammatica; La vigilia dell'Epifania; Atelier del Burattinaio; Voglio emendarmi; Portrait in costume; and Piazza Santa Maria Formosa in Venice.

He became an expert in copying masterworks in engravings and with acquaforte, including: Catacomb; Death of Pope Boniface; and Il corriere del deserto.

In 1881 at Milan, he displayed a canvas of La questua delusa and L'arrivo; in 1883 at Rome exhibited: Andiamo pel mondo ; Al tempio di Bacco; L' onomastico del confessore; and Varigolti. His Natale in convento was exhibited in 1886 at Milan. In 1887 at Venice, he sent the latter painting and various acqueforti. Among his paintings are: Il magnano of Turin and the elegant Illustrazione italiana, by the Publishing House of Treves.

Among his pupils was the alpine landscape painter Giuseppe Sauli D'Igliano.

External links
Collection of Engravings, held by Province of Lombardy].
 Engraving: Che c'è?.

References

1845 births
1905 deaths
19th-century Italian painters
Italian male painters
20th-century Italian painters
20th-century Italian male artists
Painters from Piedmont
Italian engravers
Accademia Albertina alumni
19th-century Italian male artists
20th-century engravers